Doy is a name. Notable people with the name include:

 César Doy (born 1982), Peruvian football defender
 Doy Reed (1895–1981), Australian rules footballer
 Carl Doy, British born New Zealand pianist, composer and arranger
 Clodualdo del Mundo Jr.,  Filipino screenwriter, director, and author nicknamed "Doy".
 Salvador Laurel (1928–2004), Filipino lawyer and politician, also known as Doy Laurel.
 Thritthi Nonsrichai, Thai professional footballer known as "Doy"

See also
 Ibrahim Youssef Al-Doy (born 1945), Bahraini football referee
 Cheung Chi Doy (born 1941), Chinese former professional footballer